Robert Joseph Forguites (November 24, 1938 – April 8, 2019) was an American politician in the state of Vermont.

Background
Forguites was born in Forest Dale, Vermont. He graduated from Brandon High School. Forguites served on the Town of Brandon Board of Selectmen and on the Otter Valley Union High School Board of Directors. Foguites was involved with the banking business. He was a member of the Vermont House of Representatives, sitting as a Democrat from the Windsor-3-2 district, having been first elected in 2014. Forguites died in his sleep on April 8, 2019 while serving his third term in the legislature.

References

1938 births
2019 deaths
People from Rutland County, Vermont
Businesspeople from Vermont
Military personnel from Vermont
School board members in Vermont
Democratic Party members of the Vermont House of Representatives
20th-century American businesspeople
21st-century American politicians